Sky Ranch is a network of amusement parks in the Philippines. Sky Ranch has three branches: in Tagaytay; San Fernando, Pampanga; and in Baguio. The first Sky Ranch amusement park opened in Tagaytay in 2013.

Branches

Tagaytay

The Sky Ranch branch in Tagaytay is situated along Tagaytay–Nasugbu Highway, Tagaytay, Cavite which opened in March 2013. It is located inside a property owned by SM Investments Corporation's subsidiary SM Land commercial property division (later merged with SM Prime Holdings, Inc), where several shops and restaurants are also located. The amusement park temporarily closed following ash fall caused by the Taal Volcano eruption on January 12, 2020 but reopened almost a week later on January 18.

Pampanga

The Sky Ranch branch in San Fernando, Pampanga is part of the SM City Pampanga shopping mall complex.

Baguio

The Sky Ranch branch is located at Luneta Hill, Upper Session Road, Baguio which opened in 2018. Its opening was met with opposition from surrounding universities which expressed concern on noise pollution generated by the park.

Summary

References

External links 

 

Amusement parks in the Philippines
SM Prime
Buildings and structures in Tagaytay
Tourist attractions in Cavite
2013 establishments in the Philippines
Buildings and structures in Baguio
Buildings and structures in San Fernando, Pampanga